Seoul Street Circuit is a  street circuit laid out on the city streets of Seoul, South Korea. It hosted the Seoul ePrix as the last race of 2022 Formula E season.

History
South Korea was previously unsuccessful to organize international motorsport events, such as Korean Grand Prix. However, on 30 November 2018, Formula E CEO, Alejandro Agag signed an agreement to hold the Seoul ePrix from 2020 to 2025.

The track was initially planned to be included in both 2020 Formula E calendar and 2021 Formula E calendar, however the race was cancelled due to the COVID-19 pandemic.

For the 2020 season, the race was planned to be held on 3 May 2020. And for the 2021 season, the race was provisionally planned to be held on 23 May 2021.

After the cancellation of races in both two years due to the global pandemic, it was agreed to hold the race in August 2022. After that, it was officially listed to hold the final round of the 2022 calendar.

In 2022, the ePrix was successfully held at the revised layout of the circuit. The races of ePrix were won by Mitch Evans and Edoardo Mortara, while Stoffel Vandoorne was crowned as the champion of the 2021–22 Formula E World Championship.

Even before the 2022 race, the circuit was listed on the provisional calendar of 2023 Formula E season. 

However, due to the renovation works of the Seoul Olympic Stadium, the event would not be able to take place and the circuit was dropped from the 2023 Formula E calendar in October 2022.

Layout

On 23 July 2018, a feasibility study on candidate areas including Gwanghwamun in Seoul was completed. As a result of the survey, the popular tourist area around Gwanghwamun Square and City Hall Square was selected as a candidate region.

Then, the proposed  layout was revealed in July 2019, which was located around the Seoul Olympic Stadium and some part of the track was inside of this stadium.

References

Seoul
Seoul
Sports venues in Seoul
2022 establishments in South Korea
2023 disestablishments in South Korea